The North Sea Trail is a transnational long-distance hiking trail along the coast of the North Sea. The route passes through seven countries and 26 partner areas. The aim of the project is to promote sustainable tourism and to keep alive the common cultural heritage of the North Sea countries.

The EU-funded North Sea Trail project involves Sweden, Norway, Scotland, England, the Netherlands, Denmark, and Germany.

Route
The trail starts in the north of Great Britain in Scotland and stretches along the entire east coast. The trail continues along the Dutch and German coasts to Denmark. Denmark is rounded out and the path on the west coast of Sweden continued from Kattegat to the Skagerrak. The trail then stretches along the Norwegian coast.

Only the Netherlands and Denmark offer a completed developed route. In Germany, the path is largely unknown and not signposted. On some short sections, the North Sea Trail is identical to the European long-distance path E9. On some sections, the North Sea Trail is identical to the better known North Sea Cycle Route.

Member countries

The seven countries are:
 Denmark
 Partner areas: Djursland, Thy, North Jutland, Sjælland
 England
 Partner areas: Northumberland, North York Moors
 Germany
 Partner areas: Karrharde
 Netherlands
 Partner areas: Dutch Coastal Path (Lange-Afstands-Wandelpad), passing through Friesland, Zeeland, South Holland, North Holland and Groningen
 Norway
 Partner areas: Sogn og Fjordane, Hordaland, Rogaland, Vest-Agder, Vestfold, Møre og Romsdal, Østfold
 Scotland
 Partner areas: Aberdeen City, Aberdeenshire, East Lothian (John Muir Way), Fife, and Moray Firth
 Sweden
 Partner areas: Western Götaland, Halland, Scania (Skåneleden)

North Sea Trail Association
The project was originally part funded by the European Union through its Interreg IIIB North Sea Programme.

The project partners have decided to establish a North Sea Trail Association so that the Trail can be supported in the long term. The UK's representative on the Association is Aberdeen.

There is also a North Sea Cycle Route integrated with the North Sea Trail.

See also
 List of long-distance footpaths
 Long-distance footpaths in the United Kingdom

Resources
 Aberdeen City's North Sea Trail leaflet
 Aberdeenshire Council's series of 38 downloadable maps and leaflets
 Welcome to the Moray Firth Trail

References

External links

 North Sea Trail official website does not exist any longer
North Sea Trail (from Aberdeen)
Traildino.com, "North Sea Trail"
 Website North Sea Trail in Internet Archive

Hiking trails in the Netherlands
Hiking trails in Germany
Coastal paths in the United Kingdom
Hiking trails in Denmark
Hiking trails in Norway
Hiking trails in Sweden